In a multiple-decades long period, many individuals, mostly female singers received a nickname associated with the name of the American singer-songwriter Madonna. Simultaneously, several artists have been identified with the same nickname, and many others have received more than one. 

The moniker became very visible to the point media outlets like Billboard devoted articles discussing what it means to be a Madonna while others discussed why there exists many artists with the label. Music critic Steven Hyden also explains she was often regarded as an archetype. Reviewers often addressed comparisons from different measurements and all sorts of positive things attributed to the original Madonna.

The label became visible in the profile of various performers, to which some of them have responded with mixed comments towards the moniker and comparisons with Madonna. Others declared themselves as such or wanted to be a Madonna and media followed suit. More than one performer in the late 20th century, were planned or slightly promoted as a Madonna in their debut by their record labels, according to some of them or media. In the early 21st century, music journalism and authors set a race to find "Madonna's successor", calling in the journey to various as the "next" or "new Madonna". Madonna herself, labeled Kanye West either as the "new" or "Black Madonna". References of the label are found in some musical pieces, including songs' titles, or a mention in Eminem's "Fubba U cubba cubba".

Context

Critical interest and media attention 

The nickname appeared as soon Madonna gained international recognition, commonly dated in 1985. Perhaps one of the first artists was Marie Osmond, who Los Angeles Times named her the "Mormon Madonna" at that year. Many of the Madonna-associated nicknames in the career of several individuals derived from comparison. Taking Britney Spears as example, Canadian philosopher Paul Thagard explained that "when people say that [Spears] is the new Madonna, they do not literally mean that [she] is Madonna. Rather, they are pointing out some systematic similarities between the two". In 2016, Dorian Lynskey from The Guardian felt that "most female pop stars try to emulate Madonna at some point". French academic Georges-Claude Guilbert wrote in Madonna as Postmodern Myth (2002), "the press never stops comparing female singers to Madonna". While commenting the comparison Lady Gaga has faced with Madonna, in 2011 the staff of Rolling Stone, stated Madonna "it's a hard shadow to escape". 

In the 2010s, Dutch academics from University of Amsterdam commented, female artists "are very often measured against the yardstick that Madonna has become". In 2021, biographers Isa Muguruza and Los Prieto Flores explained that every so often "there is a Mexican, a Latina Madonna and even a Black Madonna" because "she transcended her own figure", and she became in "almost a powerful adjective that translates into a way of doing things". American music critic Steven Hyden opined that "Madonna is regarded as an archetype for pop singers, an example to follow to immortality. If you can change it up like Madonna, maybe you can be Madonna. But you can't be Madonna. She's a freak-of-nature anomaly". In 2014, Orlando Sentinel music critic Jim Abbott describe New Madonna as "a necessary pop-culture occupation if ever there was one... [whose] job descriptions are constantly changing." Meanwhile, Reyhan Harmanci from San Francisco Chronicle described this trend:

Aspects 
Beyond comparisons, some media outlets described the reason of calling a performer as a Madonna. In 2017, while reviewing Rihanna as the "Black Madonna", Billboard devoted its article explaining what it means be a Madonna. They explained a Madonna has "to assume the role of a commander standing at the frontlines for womanhood", as well "the controversial complexities of human sexuality, despite the inevitable backlash to ensue" to further add a Madonna has "to be a trend-setter" and a muse for producers, songwriters, fashion designers or directors alike and match both her record sales or achievements.   

In his explanation while mentioned Gaga, Reyhan Harmanci from San Francisco Chronicle saw her as the closer example "than any past wannabes, to further adds aspects such as "iconic style" and "staying power". About this later singer, according to author Tim Delaney (2015), "most popular culture analysts view Lady Gaga as the new Madonna" Others similar claims included "popularity". Is the case of Aidin Vaziri of the same publication regarding the Iranian singer Googoosh, or authors of Encyclopedia of African Peoples and Billboard with Oumou Sangaré ("Madonna of Mali"). Madonna-like impact was also a source for other outlets to call a Madonna other non-pop musicians. This was the case of Cecilia Bartoli and her impact in the classical music stage. Bartoli herself, called Malibran as the "Madonna of her age". 

While there exists many other reasons, other group called Madonna to artists like Anita Mui with descriptions such as reinvention of image, behavior and boldness. Thus Richard Corliss from Time attributed to Mui, the nickname because "her boldness was not just a sensation but an affront" in the world of Hong Kong popular music.

Sourcing and scope

The label was used not only by music-related outlets, but appeared in outlets of generalized interest from mass media, including headlines. Figures like Mylène Farmer have even their Madonna-associated nickname in their biography profile by their record label (Universal Music France). Media often described it as a "nickname", "moniker" or "title" using descriptions such as "dubbed", "named", "widely", "sometimes", "frequently", "known", "hailed" or "branded" by "many" or "by some". Such illustrative examples of previous claims include film director Deeyah Khan to singers Anitta, Brenda Fassie, Mylène Farmer, Pandora and Anita Mui from an array sources such as The Independent, The Guardian, BBC News, News24, Billboard and O Globo among many others. Korean Broadcasting System commented with Uhm Jung-hwa, that she is "often praised" as "the Korean Madonna".

Some nicknames, however, were applied in a determined region, or from an international perspective instead of their own country or vice versa. In Russia Beyond, Vasily Shumov wrote the examples of Russian female pop singers, explaining they don't have an "equivalent" Russian female musician with famous West music figures such as Madonna. Conversely, many Russian female singers were called a Madonna by overseas press, from Alla Pugacheva to Anna Netrebko and Irene Nelson among many others. In 2004, two articles from Czech newspaper Mladá fronta DNES similarly discussed they still missing to have a national-equivalent Madonna (Česká Madonna). Names proposed ranged from Anna K, Dara Rolins to Helena Vondráčková, Petra Janů and Bára Basiková among others. With Vondráčková it was said that "would not be out of the question in the future"; in Basiková's case, Czech website Musicserver discussed her possibility. In Latvia, journalist and founder of Mikrofona ieraksti, Elita Mīlgrāve told Baltic News Network, that they don't have a "Latvian Madonna" but they might have one day.

Cases like Natalia Oreiro were associated with a Madonna-moniker but applied to the region where she was popular despite her cultural roots. She was called such as "Eastern European Madonna", "Argentine Madonna" or a "Russian Madonna" due her success in the latter country. Similarly, American-born singers like Selena and Lisa Lisa, were called "Mexican Madonna" or "Hispanic Madonna". In Selena's case, according to authors of Afterlife as Afterimage: Understanding Posthumous Fame (2005) it was "presumably to provide a vivid referent to non-Latinos".

Many individuals declared themselves as to be a Madonna or wanted to be one, while media outlets followed suit in many of them. Courtney E. Smith includes Miley Cyrus, Rihanna, and Avril Lavigne as examples. Others such as Pixie Lott, Christina Aguilera and Wendy Sulca have also declared wanted to be a Madonna at some stage of their career. Sulca reminded that many artists want to be a Madonna. Another example is Jamaican singer Tifa, who declared wanted to be the "Jamaican Madonna". In 2007, Soraya Arnelas declared not be ready to be a Madonna but almost a decade later, in 2016, she described herself as the "Spanish Madonna". American rapper Lil' Kim also called herself the "Black Madonna". In 2018, Azealia Banks explained in Twitter why she feels like "the Black Madonna":

Others were called by an individual as a Madonna but perhaps were not followed by other media reports. In 2019, for example designer Marko Monroe deemed Lizzo as the "Madonna of her generation", while Farina also considered Tokischa as the Madonna-equivalent to the urban music of her generation. Robert Christgau called Sinéad O'Connor a "folkie Madonna", while Whitney Houston was called the "Black Madonna" in 1988 by Santiago Alcanda. Mónica Naranjo was a similar example, as her hairdresser wanted to present her as the "Spanish Madonna". Before fame, others called themselves as such. Toni Braxton, recalls: "In high school, I was trying to be the Black Madonna".

Impact 
Terri Rupar from Washington Post asked: does every country have a Madonna?. Writer Rodrigo Fresán commented that "we think of the Madonnas to come as we think of science" which is increasingly less fiction.

On artists' careers 

According to media reports or some artists themselves, a bunch of artists were planned by their managers or record labels to be marketed as a Madonna. Is the case attributed to Martika by CBS Records, Byanka from Mexico or La India by Reprise; La India commented that this inspired her to choose her stage name because she avoided that label. Ana Curra also said that her label Hispavox planned to promote her as the "Spanish Madonna". Other artists slightly "promoted" as Madonnas, were Natasha Alexandrovna called the "Russian Madonna", and according to Ioannis Polychronakis from Linköping University, Anna Vissi was "loudly promoted as the 'Greek Madonna'". In other reports, some artists like Lisa Lisa were "billed" as a Madonna. British opera singer Lesley Garrett was promoted by her record company with a "Madonna of the opera stage image"; various outlets like Time magazine compared her with Madonna, and others dubbed her the "Madonna of the opera world". On the report of Opera magazine, she once confessed that she planned to "emulate Madonna Ciccone".

In a 1993 interview with Los Angeles Times, Gloria Trevi said: "Many artists in Mexico fight to be the Latina Madonna". Back in 1986, Singaporean newspaper The Straits Times discussed how a number of artists in Asia were compared to Madonna, receiving a Madonna-moniker, but also explored how it helped boost their popularity. They described:

 
According to Mirna Abdulaal of Egyptian Streets, in the case of Egyptian singer Simone Philip Kamel "countless producers wanted to put their hands" in Kamel, noted her as a "Madonna" lookalike, and for which "Madonna Masr" later came to be one of her nicknames in the country. According to Time magazine, South African artist Brenda Fassie nicknamed a Madonna, one local paper even reprinted (verbatim) an interview with Madonna, replacing her name with Fassie's. On the other hand, scholars Gregory Booth and Bradley Shope, noticed that Alisha Chinai "gained notoriety as the 'Indian Madonna'", while ethnomusicologist Bruno Nettl opined that she earned a reputation by catering to the South Asian interest in Madonna, "recasting both the image and the music of the global star in South Asian cultural terms and in the Hindi language".

Reactions 

In 2015, Madonna herself called Kanye West either the "new" or "Black Madonna". As a visible label to many, various of these performers have commented the comparison and nickname with mixed responses. In her case, Lady Gaga recalls: "I always used to say to people, when they would say, 'Oh, she's the next Madonna.' No, I'm the next Iron Maiden". Insooni also denied her Madonna-nickname saying: "I'm Korea's Insooni, and always will be". Others similarly refuted the tag, or comparison, including Argentine singer Patricia Sosa, English singer Sarah Brightman, American singer Hilary Duff, and Australian musician Kylie Minogue.

In positive reactions, Jolin Tsai whose has been called a Madonna, responded to El País the comparison saying that "Madonna is a goal", and is a reflection of a woman who does what she sets out to do. In a conversation with German magazine Focus, Serbian singer Jelena Karleuša accepted the nickname associated with Madonna. American rapper Lil' Kim also did it. Brazilian artist Anitta deemed it as a "honor", and similar feelings was shared by Mexican singer Paulina Rubio saying she was "proud" since are her fans "who decide it". BBC News let Ayi Jihu known of her nickname "China's Madonna" calling it as an "accolade" and with Jihu responding "I'm very honoured".

Other artists declared to be "tired" of being compared and receiving a moniker related to her, such as Latina singers Gloria Estefan or Gloria Trevi. Estefan confessed in 1989: "I'm getting bored being compared to Madonna". Spanish singer Marta Sánchez was a similar case, as Sánchez reported that even when she lived in New York, people called her "Madonna" all the time. While she found "flattering" being compared to her, also commented it was exhausted saying "I don't want to be a Madonna". 

Other artists felt flattered by the comparison, admiring Madonna but not liking the moniker. Albanian singer Bleona which publicly discussed this association is part of this group. Italian singer, Ivana Spagna said: "I never wanted to be another Madonna, even though some people compared me to her. Madonna is Madonna, and nobody else could be like that". German singer Nena was neutral towards the comparison. South African singer, Brenda Fassie, according to Time magazine liked Madonna but doesn't understand the comparison. "Maybe it's because of the way we dress", she said.

Criticisms
Sergio del Amo, editor of El País, observed the year 2017 (and surrounding years) as the political correctness era in the pop stardom, with several female singers releasing records and presenting a softer image such as Miley Cyrus (Younger Now), Lady Gaga (Joanne) and Kesha (Rainbow); as Madonna did with Something to Remember and other records. This led the author to conclude that "nobody wants to be Madonna anymore" as the price to pay of a sexual image is "much higher" than it think. Writing for the Washington Post, Richard Harrington called it a "dreadful nickname" when referring PJ Harvey's moniker of "the indie Madonna". After being called a Madonna, Christina Rosenvinge criticized "female music has become a slutty contest".

Some journalists seemed a "meaningless analogy" comparison with Madonna. Is the case of British journalist Nigel Williamson with Oumou Sangare. As "Madonna" was a common nickname in the case of American singer Selena, music executive José Behar questioned that she would not be "comfortable" with that; and the only thing she had in common with Madonna was the bustiers. According to Guilbert, Celine Dion was often hailed as the "anti–Madonna".

Cultural references

Artists such as Venus D-Lite, Sarit Hadad or Hi Fashion have released songs with the title "I'm Not Madonna". Indian rapper Baba Sehgal titled an album Main Bhi Madonna (I Am Also Madonna), while Eminem included a verse in "Fubba U cubba cubba". Alisha Chinai named her 1992 album as Madonna of India. Collins COBUILD Advanced Dictionary (2016), included a sentence referring to a singer as "billed as the next Madonna".

Outside music industry
This label transcended both the music and entertainment industries. Politicians such as Donald Trump and Hillary Clinton were discussed as to be a Madonna with the same analogy of doing things or a Madonna-like impact in their areas. Eva Perón was called the political Madonna of Argentina in a 1997 article of The Baltimore Sun. U.S. News & World Report called Dennis Rodman, "a black and male version of Madonna". Argentines plastic artists Sergio De Loof or Marta Minujín were nicknamed or declared themselves to be a Madonna. Len Blavatnik, was called "Madonna of billionaires". In a 1999 article, Slate magazine, listed as the "Madonnas" of the age of stock market, and celebration of the entrepreneur to individuals from Bill Gates to Steve Ballmer. Shiva Rea, nicknamed "the Madonna of yoga", dismissed the tag.

Selected list

Many of artists received the nickname in their country or region alone, or by contrast, from an international view. Others were called a Madonna by some point of their career, while others during their entire public life. Several artists received more than one nickname related-to-Madonna; those artists with more than one nickname are highlighted in bold.

The label have appeared in cultural institutions, scholarly references, encyclopedias, newspaper of records and others outlets. Most individuals listed here have more than one reference, and with other languages aside English. Male are distinguished with the gender symbol (♂).

By region

By nationality

By race and ethnicity

By music genres

By generation

By beliefs and professions

See also
 Madonna wannabe
 Madonna impersonator
 Honorific nicknames in popular music

Notes

References

Book sources

 
 
 
 
 
 
 
 
 
 
 
 
 
 
 
 
 
 
 
 
 
 
 
 
 
 
 
 
 
 
 
 
 
 
 
 
 
 
 
 
 
 
 
 
 
 
 
 
 
 
 
 
 
 
 
 
 
 

Madonna
Nicknames in music
Nicknames